William John Parry (28 March 1842 – 1927) was a Welsh businessman, politician and author. Parry was a leading voice in a range of activities and causes, and was the first general secretary of the North Wales Quarrymen's Union.

Born in Bethesda to John and Elizabeth, Parry was a religious man who took a keen interest in the plight of the slate and stone quarry workers local to his home town. Parry took a prominent part in the creation of the North Wales Quarrymen's Union in 1874, and as well as taking the role as general secretary, later became the union's president. In 1879 he visited slate mines in the United States on the request of his union.

In 1889 Parry became a member of the first Caernarfonshire County Council, and its chairman in 1892–1893. In 1896, he led the purchase of the Pantdreiniog quarry in Bethesda and was became the manager.

Parry wrote for several local newspapers, in both the Welsh and English language, and published several books. Of note are his works y Ymdrafodaeth (1875) and The Penrhyn Lock-out (1900). Many of his papers and writings are held at Bangor University.

References

1842 births
1927 deaths
Welsh journalists
Welsh-language writers
Welsh trade unionists